Silas Raynard Redd Jr. (born March 1, 1992) is a former American football running back. He played college football at Penn State and USC, and was signed as an undrafted free agent by the Washington Redskins in 2014. His football career ended after injuries and violations of the league's substance-abuse policy.

Redd was signed to play rugby league for the Ipswich Jets in the Australian Intrust Super Cup in 2018, but did not play in any league games for the team.

Early years
Redd  played in the 2010 U.S. Army All-American Bowl.

Redd attended King School, a private, Co-ed College preparatory school in preparatory Stamford, Connecticut alongside NFL Line-Backer Kevin Pierre-Louis who was his teammate on the school's football team.

College career

Redd served as a backup in 2010, and became Penn State's lead running back in 2011.  He rushed for 1,188 yards in the 2011 regular season, third most in the Big Ten Conference and 22nd most among all NCAA Football Bowl Subdivision players.  He ranked 28th in the Football Bowl Subdivision in rushing yards per game.

Redd rushed for 100 or more yards in six of 12 games for Penn State in 2011, including a career-high 164 yards against Northwestern on October 22, 2011.

On July 31, 2012, Redd announced he would transfer to USC in the wake of NCAA sanctions levied against the Nittany Lions football program that gave players an opportunity to transfer to another major program without sitting out a year.  Redd practiced with the Trojans for the first time on August 6. He finished his first year with 905 rushing yards and nine touchdowns.

Redd remained at USC for his senior season. He played in six games, rushing for 376 yards with one touchdown.

Statistics

Professional career

Redd was signed by the Washington Redskins on May 10, 2014 as an undrafted free agent. Despite being undrafted, Redd made the Redskins' final 53-man roster on August 30 beating out Evan Royster, Lache Seastrunk and Chris Thompson for the third-string running back spot. In the 41-10 win in Week 2 against the Jacksonville Jaguars, he recorded his first career touchdown.

Redd tore his right-anterior cruciate ligament (ACL)  and medial collateral ligament (MCL) in the first 2015 preseason game against the Cleveland Browns. On August 16, 2015, he was waived/injured. After going unclaimed, he was placed on injured reserve. On November 18, 2015, the NFL suspended him for four games, without pay, for violating the league's substance-abuse policy. On April 12, 2016, Redd was suspended indefinitely for another violation of the substance-abuse policy.

He was waived by the Redskins on December 27, 2016, after being reinstated from suspension.

Rugby league career

In October 2017, Redd signed on to play rugby league with the professional Ipswich Jets of the Queensland Cup for the 2018 season. He played in one off-season exhibition match in Hawaii between the Jets and the Tweed Heads Seagulls. In May 2018, Redd returned to the USA without playing a game in the Queensland Cup.

References

External links
 Washington Redskins bio
 Penn State Nittany Lions bio
 USC Trojans bio

1992 births
Living people
American rugby league players
Ipswich Jets players
Sportspeople from Norwalk, Connecticut
Players of American football from Connecticut
American football running backs
Penn State Nittany Lions football players
USC Trojans football players
Washington Redskins players
African-American players of American football
21st-century African-American sportspeople